John Douglas (April 24, 1930 – January 12, 2003) was a Canadian ice hockey defenceman who competed in the 1960 Winter Olympics.

Early life 
Douglas was born in Trenton, Ontario. He played junior hockey with Pembroke Lumber Kings.

Career 
Douglas won the silver medal at the 1960 Winter Olympics in ice hockey. He also played for Indianapolis Chiefs, Chatham Maroons, and Pittsburgh Hornets. Douglas played one match in the American Hockey League and 119 matches in the International Hockey League. Throughout his hockey career, he was known for his "six inch slapper," a powerful slapshot performed by moving his stick only six inches.

External links

 Jack Douglas' profile at Sports Reference.com

References 

1930 births
2003 deaths
Canadian ice hockey defencemen
Ice hockey players at the 1960 Winter Olympics
Indianapolis Chiefs players
Olympic ice hockey players of Canada
Olympic silver medalists for Canada
People from Quinte West
Pittsburgh Hornets players
Olympic medalists in ice hockey
Medalists at the 1960 Winter Olympics
20th-century Canadian people